The Queen's Award for Enterprise: International Trade (Export) (2005) was awarded on 21 April 2005, by Queen Elizabeth II.

Recipients
The following organisations were awarded this year.
Abbot Group plc of Altens, Aberdeen, Scotland for Onshore and offshore drilling, engineering and rig design.
Abcam Limited of Cambridge for Antibodies and related reagents.
Advanced Crusher Spares Ltd of Minworth, Sutton Coldfield, West Midlands for Spare parts for crushing and recycling machines.
Allen Group Limited of Bodelwyddan, Denbighshire, Wales for Pneumatic and hydraulic tubing, electrical cable and formed tube assemblies for use on commercial vehicles.
Alvan Blanch Development Company Limited of Malmesbury, Wiltshire for Crop processing equipment.
Arcotronics Limited of Towcester, Northamptonshire for Electronic components.
Aromco Ltd of Nuthampstead, Royston, Hertfordshire for Food flavourings.
Atkin Chambers of London WC1 for Legal services.
BUPA International of Brighton, Sussex for Private medical insurance.
BananaStock Ltd of Watlington, Oxfordshire for Royalty free CD-ROM and down-loadable stock photography images.
Bartec Auto ID Limited of Barnsley, South Yorkshire for Tyre pressure monitoring equipment.
Edmund Bell & Company Limited of Bradford for Domestic and contract home furnishing textiles.
The Bruichladdich Distillery Co. Ltd of Argyll, Scotland for Islay single malt Scotch whisky.
Canongate Books Ltd of Edinburgh, Scotland for Book publishing.
Cellhire plc of York for Rental of telecommunications products.
Checker Leather Limited of Kilmaurs, Kilmarnock, Scotland for Leather goods.
F. J. Church & Sons Ltd of Rainham, Essex for Non-ferrous scrap metal.
Colin Stewart Minchem Ltd of Winsford, Cheshire for Industrial minerals, inorganic chemicals and additives.
Cunningham Lindsey International Limited of London E1 for Insurance consultancy services.
Dansco Dairy Products Ltd of Newcastle Emlyn, Carmarthenshire, Wales for Mozzarella cheese and other dairy products.
Datapath Limited of Derby for Computer graphic boards and accessories.
James Dawson & Son Ltd of Lincoln for Silicone and organic specialist automotive hoses.
Delcam plc of Birmingham for CADCAM software.
Delta Biotechnology Limited of Nottingham for Recombinant human albumin production from proprietary high yield yeast expression system.
Diomed Limited of Waterbeach, Cambridge for Laser equipment for medical use and related products.
Dunn Brothers (1995) Ltd of Smethwick, West Midlands for Scrap metal recycling.
Extec Screens & Crushers Ltd of Swadlincote, Derbyshire for Screening and crushing equipment.
Fine Fragrances & Cosmetics Ltd of Sunbury-on-Thames, Middlesex for Toiletries and cosmetics.
FlavorActiV Limited of Chinnor, Oxfordshire for Development and provision of professional taster products.
Fonebak Plc of West Thurrock, Grays, Essex for Mobile phone reuse and recycling.
G. D. Metal Recycling Ltd of London N18 for Recycling of scrap metal and waste.
G.R. Micro Limited of London NW1 for Medical microbiology and molecular biology services.
Gate 7 Ltd of Gateshead for Decals and labels.
Genesys International Limited of Burnham, Slough for Chemicals and services to the international water industry used for water purification.
GigaSat Limited of Kensworth, Dunstable, Bedfordshire for Satellite communication equipment.
GreenMech Ltd of Alcester, Warwickshire for Wood chippers and green waste shredders.
Heber Limited of Stroud, Gloucestershire for Electronic control systems for amusement, gaming, vending and high reliability embedded applications.
Helen of Troy (UK) Ltd of Sheffield for Manufacturing and distribution of small electrical personal care appliances.
K Home International Limited of Thornaby, Stockton-on-Tees for project management and engineering design services.
ICAP plc of London EC2 for finance broking.
Image Source of London EC1 for Royalty free digital photography.
Inca Digital Printers Ltd of Cambridge for industrial digital flatbed inkjet printers.
Indamex Limited of Peterborough for diesel engine driven generating sets.
Intex Management Services Ltd t/a IMS Research of Wellingborough, Northamptonshire for market research in the electronics industry.
Investment Property Databank of London NW1 for Property investment indices and performance analysis.
Isle of Arran Distillers Ltd of Stirling, Scotland for Malt and blended Scotch whisky and cream liqueur.
JCB Backhoe Loader Business Unit of Rocester, Uttoxeter, Staffordshire for Backhoe loaders.
Andrew Kain Enterprises Ltd (AKE Ltd) of Hereford for Risk mitigation.
Kemistry of London EC2 for Broadcast design.
LibraPharm Ltd of Thatcham, Berkshire for Medical journals and reprints.
Martek Marine Ltd of Rotherham, South Yorkshire for Safety monitoring systems for marine vessels.
Martin Currie Limited of Edinburgh, Scotland for Investment management.
Microsulis Ltd of Denmead, Waterlooville, Hampshire for Microwave Endometrial Ablation (MEA) system.
Millbrook Instruments Limited of Blackburn for Instruments for the surface analysis of advanced materials.
Molecular Products Limited of Dunmow, Essex for Chemical filtration products for air purification.
NavisWorks Limited of Sheffield for computer software.
Newson Gale Ltd of Nottingham for electrostatic grounding systems for hazardous areas.
Nitecrest Ltd of Leyland, Preston, Lancashire for telephone, credit and loyalty cards.
Noahs Ark Chemicals Ltd of Cambridge for bulk and speciality chemicals.
Northbrook Technology of Northern Ireland Limited of Belfast, Northern Ireland for information technology and business process outsourcing.
Oceanair Marine Ltd of Selsey, Chichester, West Sussex for Blinds and flyscreens for windows and hatches on boats and vehicles.
Outokumpu Stainless Ltd, ASR Rod Mill of Sheffield for stainless steel rod in coil.
BL-Pegson Ltd of Coalville, Leicestershire for Rock crushing plant and machinery.
Pelam Foods Limited of Amersham, Buckinghamshire for Food and drink merchant.
Performance Plus—a business unit of John Crane UK Ltd of TraVord Park, Manchester for Consultancy and reliability services for rotating equipment.
Perkins Shibaura Engines Limited of Peterborough for Compact sub 75 hp diesel engines.
Pipeshield International Limited of Lowestoft, Suffolk for Specialised protection and support systems for marine/oVshore structures and pipelines.
Powershield Doors Limited of Lisburn, County Antrim, Northern Ireland for steel doors and steel framed glazing systems.
Rock Fall Company Ltd of Dundonald, Kilmarnock, Scotland for underwater drilling and blasting engineering.
Rotary (International) Limited of Newtownabbey, County Antrim, Northern Ireland for building services engineers.
Sat-Comm Ltd of Mildenhall, Bury St Edmunds, Suffolk for Satellite uplink systems.
Scientific Games International Limited of Leeds for Security printing.
Shipham Valves of Hull, East Yorkshire for Non-ferrous and high alloy valves.
Silver Fox Limited of Welwyn Garden City, Hertfordshire for Labelling solutions for both the energy and telecommunications industries.
Singletons Dairy Ltd of Preston, Lancashire for Quality cheeses.
Smith & Ouzman Limited of Eastbourne, Sussex for Security printed documents.
Sortex Limited of London E15 for Optical sorters used to detect and remove diseased and foreign material from crops.
Specialised Petroleum Services International Limited t/a SPS International of Westhill, Aberdeenshire, Scotland for Wellbore completion services.
Tilhill Forestry Ltd of Stirling, Scotland for Forest management, timber harvesting and wood fibre supply.
Toyota Motor Manufacturing (UK) Limited of Burnaston, Derby for Passenger vehicles, parts and engines.
Tracerco of Billingham, Cleveland for Process diagnostic services, specialist measurement devices and fuel marking technologies.
Trackwise Designs t/a Trackwise of Tewkesbury, Gloucestershire for High frequency printed circuit boards.
Trinity International Services Ltd of Aberdeen, Scotland for Offshore and remote-site catering and hotel-keeping services.
University of Essex of Colchester, Essex for Higher education.
University of Westminster of London W1 for Higher education.
Varn Products Company Limited of Irlam, Manchester for Chemicals and solvents for the graphic arts industry.
Viridian Energy Supply Limited t/a Energia of Belfast, Northern Ireland for Retail electricity and gas supply.
Yes Group Limited of Hull, East Yorkshire for Bespoke marine electronic equipment.

References

Queen's Award for Enterprise: International Trade (Export)
2005 in the United Kingdom